"Vuelvo a verte" is a song recorded by the Spanish singer-songwriters Malú featuring Pablo Alborán. The song was released in November 2012 and peaked at number 1 on the Spanish Singles Chart in March 2013.

The song won "Best Spanish Song" at Los Premios 40 Principales 2013 awards.

Music video
The music video for "Vuelvo a verte" was released on 9 June 2013.

Track listing

Chart performance

Weekly charts

Year-end charts

Release history

See also
 List of number-one singles of 2013 (Spain)

References

2012 singles
2012 songs
Pablo Alborán songs
Number-one singles in Spain
Songs written by Pablo Alborán